Koukdjuak may refer to:

 Great Plain of the Koukdjuak
 Koukdjuak River